was a river gunboat of the Imperial Japanese Navy,  that operated on the Yangtze River and in coastal waters of China during the 1930s, and during the Second Sino-Japanese War and World War II.

Background
Saga was constructed due to dissatisfaction by the Imperial Japanese Navy with the gunboat , which was underarmed, and lacked the suitable accommodations to serve as a gunboat flagship. The Japanese Navy also wanted a vessel which could serve for both coastal patrol duties as well as on inland waterways. 
Saga was laid down at Sasebo Naval Arsenal on 7 January 1912, launched on 27 September 1912 and entered service on 18 November 1912.

Design
The basic design of Saga was modeled after her British built predecessors, but with much larger dimensions and much more powerful engines. She was propelled by two reciprocating engines with two Kampon boilers driving three shafts, producing 1600 hp and a top speed of 15 knots. 
The ship was initially armed with one 12 cm/45 10th Year Type naval gun  guns, three / 40 cal. guns and six 6.6mm machine guns.

Service record
During the World War I, Saga accompanied the main Japanese fleet to Shandong Province, China at the Siege of Tsingtao (25 September-16 November 1914) against the forces of Imperial Germany as part of Japanese’ contribution to the Allied cause under the Anglo-Japanese Alliance. Subsequently, she was transferred to the Japanese Second Fleet and assigned to patrols in the South China Sea.

In September 1924, Saga was reassigned to the Japanese First Fleet. Commander Chūichi Nagumo served as captain from 20 March 1926 to 15 October 1926. She was reassigned to the Japanese Third Fleet from June 1931, joining the 11th Sentai in October 1937 after the Marco Polo Bridge Incident and the start of hostilities in the Second Sino-Japanese War. From 15 December 1938 to 20 October 1939, she was captained by Commander Tamotsu Oishi. From November 1939, she was assigned to the Second China Expeditionary Fleet in southern China.
At the time of the attack on Pearl Harbor, Saga was based at Guangdong and was assigned to the Japanese invasion force for the Battle of Hong Kong, where she was based afterwards. She was sunk by a sea mine on 26 September 1944 off Hong Kong, and later refloated and towed back to Hong Kong for repairs. On 22 January 1945, while still in dock for repairs, she was destroyed during an air raid, probably by USAAF 14th Air Force Consolidated B-24 Liberators. She was struck from the navy list on 20 March 1945.

References

External links
 
  Monograph 144 Chapter II

Notes

Gunboats of the Imperial Japanese Navy
1912 ships
Ships built by Sasebo Naval Arsenal
Second Sino-Japanese War naval ships of Japan
Ships sunk by mines
Ships sunk by US aircraft
Maritime incidents in September 1944
Maritime incidents in January 1945